Cryomyces antarcticus is a fungus of uncertain placement in the class Dothideomycetes, division Ascomycota. Found in Antarctica, it was described as new to science in 2005. It has been found to be able to survive the harsh outer space environment and cosmic radiation. A proposed mechanistic contributor to the unique resilience observed in C. antarcticus is the presence of its thick and highly melanized cell walls.  This melanin may act to protect DNA from damage while C. antarcticus is exposed to conditions that are unsuitable for typical DNA repair systems to function.

References

External links

Dothideomycetes enigmatic taxa
Fungi described in 2005
Fungi of Antarctica